A Hoax is a 1936 German comedy film directed by E. W. Emo and starring Paul Hörbiger, Trude Marlen, and Hans Moser. It was shot at the National Studios in Berlin. The film's sets were designed by Otto Erdmann and Hans Sohnle.

Synopsis
A hotel is financially struggling until the nearby lunatic asylum is forced to close following a fire and all the patients move into her premises. Confusion arises when a new hotel guest arrives only to be mistaken for a lunatic.

Main cast

References

Bibliography 
 
 Klaus, Ulrich J. Deutsche Tonfilme: Jahrgang 1936. Klaus-Archiv, 1988.

External links 
 

1936 films
1936 comedy films
Films of Nazi Germany
German comedy films
1930s German-language films
Films directed by E. W. Emo
German black-and-white films
Tobis Film films
1930s German films